Contact Sport is a solo album released by rapper, Keak da Sneak.

Track listing
"Bumpers and Rear Ends"- 3:21  
"You Doing It"- 3:43  
"Contact Sport"- 3:11  
"Do That" (featuring I-Rocc)- 3:25  
"Do Wit You Now"- 3:45  
"Gettin Money"- 3:08  
"No Can Do"- 4:00  
"Not Listening"- 3:53  
"Shake It"- 3:17  
"Played You"- 4:01  
"Aaadddimin" (featuring 12 Gauge Shotie)- 3:22  
"Super Hyphy" (Remix)- 3:44  
"Talk a Good One"- 3:05

2006 albums
Keak da Sneak albums